The 2000 European Archery Championships is the 16th edition of the European Archery Championships. The event was held in Antalya, Turkey from 15 to 20 June, 2002.

Medal table

Medal summary

Recurve

Compound

References

External links
 Results

European Archery Championships
2000 in archery
International archery competitions hosted by Turkey
2000 in European sport